Tosin Oshinowo is a Nigerian architect, creative entrepreneur, public speaker and author.

Known for her works on the design of Maryland Mall in Lagos, Tosin is a graduate of Architecture from Kingston College London and had her master's degree in Urban designs from Bartlett School of Architecture, University College London. Having worked on a number of projects in various Architectural firms in Europe and Africa, Tosin incorporated her own Architectural Design Consultancy firm, CmDesign Atelier in 2012. Tosin Oshinowo is also the Founder and Chief Executive of Lifestyle furniture line, Ile ila (House of Lines). Tosin is a member of Nigerian Institute of Architects (NIA) and also a registered architect with Architects Registration Council of Nigeria (ARCON) In 2019, Oshinowo was featured in the Polaris catalogue produced by Visual Collaborative, she was interviewed alongside other practitioners from around the world.

Career 
Tosin's choice of career as an Architect was primarily informed by tendencies indicated at an early stage of life. In an interview she granted Omenkaonline.com, Tosin attributes her choice to self-discovery of her creativity, her success in Technical Drawing while in high school, and her innate ability to understand drawings at her tender age of twelve, as well as her exposure to site works accompanying her father to site when his retirement home was being built.

Early Practice: London to Rotterdam  (2007–2009)
Shortly after her education, before leaving London, Tosin worked with Skidmore Owning and Merril's LLP London between June and October 2007 after which she moved to Metropolitan Architecture in Rotterdam from January 2008 to January 2009, where she was part of a team of six that designed the proposed double-decker Forth Mainland Bridge meant to link Ajah and Ikorodu, in Lagos State.

James Cubitt Architects Nigeria
In January, 2009, after training in Europe and few years of practice, Tosin returned to Nigeria and joined James Cubitt Architects where she worked on the Nigerian Liquefied Natural Gas (NLNG) projects as lead architect, a project which Tosin, in an interview granted Future Lagos' Ayo Denton, said taught her involvement of stakeholders during design process. Tosin worked with James Cubitt for four years. On leaving James Cubitt Architects, Tosin floated her own Architecture firm, CmDesign Atelier (cmD+A) in 2012, it is with this imprint that Tosin, as Team Lead designed Maryland Mall, Lagos (referred to as the Big Black Box by livingspace.net ) among other projects the firm has worked on.

SHO-N-TELL
Tosin Oshinowo is the convener of Sho-n-Tell, an annual event series that creates a platform for undergraduate and postgraduate students of the University of Lagos to share the same studio with practicing professionals in order to enhance their learning through exposure to the professionals' wealth of experience. The event series held from 2009 to 2014

Ile Ila
Ile Ila (House of Lines), a contemporary Nigerian lifestyle furniture line, was founded by Tosin Oshinowo in 2017. The brand has had prominent Nigerian Entertainment acts including Adekunle Gold and Chidinma feature in different campaigns as muse.

While her architectural aesthetic utilizes a minimalistic approach, the furniture designs of Ile Ila draw on the opposite end of the vibrancy spectrum and are known for its bold, colorful expressions. Tosin's collections are handmade in Lagos incorporating iconic traditional West African fabrics and Nigerian teak wood

References 

Year of birth missing (living people)
Living people
Nigerian women architects
Architects from Lagos
Queen's College, Lagos alumni
Alumni of the Architectural Association School of Architecture
People from Ibadan
21st-century Nigerian architects
Alumni of Kingston University
Alumni of The Bartlett
Nigerian furniture designers
Nigerian women company founders
Nigerian expatriates in the United Kingdom